Samuel Aruwan (born 10 May 1982) is a Nigerian journalist, and pioneer Commissioner for Kaduna State Ministry of Internal Security and Home Affairs.

Early life and education 
Samuel Aruwan hails from Kabala West in Tudun Wada District, Kaduna South Local Government Area of Kaduna State, Nigeria.

Aruwan is a graduate of Mass Communication from Kaduna Polytechnic, Kaduna. In December 2002, he completed Basic and Second Level training on Alternatives to Violence Project Course (AVP) sponsored by International Committee of the Red Cross (ICRC) Geneva and Nigerian Red Cross Society. He also completed an in-depth course in Participatory Video by Insight International in collaboration with the Development Research Centre on Citizenship, Participation and Accountability, Institute of Development Studies, Sussex in October 2006. In 2012, he attended the African Investigative Journalism training at the University of the Witwatersrand, South Africa. He was one of the Nigerian journalists trained on countering religious extremism at the Tony Blair Institute for Global Change, London in 2014 and at Drew University’s Institute on Religion and Conflict Transformation, New Jersey in 2016. In April 2021, he attended the Cranfield University’s Continuing Professional Development course on Protecting Critical National Infrastructure (CNI). He also obtained a certificate in counter-terrorism and intelligence at the same Cranfield University in December 2022 with distinction.

Journalism and public service

He is a professional journalist with over a decade experience before joining public service in 2015.

His journalism career began as an intern at the New Nigerian Newspapers and Daily Independent Newspapers, after which he joined Leadership Newspapers Group where he progressed from reporter to bureau chief. In October 2011 he joined Blueprint Newspapers Limited as chief of the Kaduna bureau. In December 2014 he took a leave of absence to serve as spokesperson to Malam Nasir Ahmad el-Rufai, a governorship candidate in Kaduna State in the 2015 general elections.

In May 2015, Governor El-Rufai appointed him special assistant for media and publicity and official spokesperson of the Governor and Government of Kaduna State. In May 2017, he was promoted to senior special assistant for media and publicity.

Aruwan played a key role in the 2019 election campaigns and the successes in both the presidential and governorship elections.

Since 2015, he has been a member of Kaduna State Security Council, which comprises heads of all military, police and para-military agencies operating in the State.

On 12 July 2019, he took oath of office as a Commissioner and member of the Kaduna State Executive Council. His key role is coordinating the internal security functions, and leading government policies on Internal security management of Kaduna state. In January 2021, Aruwan bagged the award of Crisis Manager of the Year at the annual Security and Emergency Management Awards (SAEMA) 2020.

References

1982 births
Living people
People from Kaduna
Nigerian journalists
Kaduna Polytechnic alumni